Salina celebensis is a species of elongate-bodied springtail within the family Paronellidae. Its distribution is in the mountains of China, although it has been introduced in the Hawaiian Islands.

References 

Collembola
Animals described in 1898
Arthropods of China
Arthropods of Hawaii